Josh Archibald-Seiffer (born December 15, 1987) is an American pianist and composer. On the Grammy award-winning album  Monsters, Inc. Scream Factory Favorites he co-wrote (with Woody Paul) the song "A Perfect Roar".

Life
Archibald-Seiffer received his Bachelor's Degree in music  from Stanford University, graduating  with Music Department Honors and with “University Distinction” - the  highest recognition Stanford offers. He was also the recipient of the Carolyn Applebaum Memorial Award for outstanding contributions to the Department of Music, and Stanford’s Robert Golden Medal for achievement in the creative and performing arts.

Currently, Archibald-Seiffer is a conductor and company pianist for the Pacific Northwest Ballet in Seattle, WA.  Among his musical accolades are the 2010 Carolyn Applebaum Memorial Award, the 2010 Robert M. Golden Medal for Excellence in the Humanities and Creative Arts for his Piano Trio, first-place finishes in the national student composition contests run by the Music Teachers’ National Association and the National Federation of Music Clubs for his piece for string quartet, Introspection and Rondo, and a Merit Award for Composition in the ARTS Recognition Talent Search, sponsored by the National Foundation for the Advancement of the Arts.  His music has been performed by ensembles such as the Seattle Symphony, Beta Collide, sfSound, the Stanford Faculty Piano Trio, and the Texas State University Faculty String Quartet.  He is currently a student of Joël-François Durand.

Archibald-Seiffer appeared on Jeopardy! on the episode aired May 2, 2019, where he unsuccessfully challenged record-setting champion James Holzhauer.

References

External links
 YouTube Video
 The New Expressivity: Josh Archibald Seiffer at TEDxUofW

Living people
American male composers
21st-century American composers
1987 births
American male pianists
21st-century American pianists
21st-century American male musicians
Jeopardy! contestants